Hanna Bogna Margońska, born 1968 (fl. 1998) is a Polish botanist known for her work on orchids.

Dr. Hanna Margońska is a botanical researcher and faculty member at Gdańsk University, Department of Plant Taxonomy and Conservation.

Scholarly publications

1998 
 Dariusz L. Szlachetko, Hanna B. Margońska, Piotr Rutkowski. 1998. Fingardia yamapensis, a new orchid species of Orchidaceae from New Guinea. Fragm. Flor. Geobot. 43 (1): 3–6.
 Dariusz L. Szlachetko, Hanna B. Margońska. 1998. Three new species of the genus Crepidium Bl. (Orchidaceae) from South-Eastern Asia. Fragm. Flor. Geobot. 43 (1): 7-12.
 Nicolas Halle, Dariusz L. Szlachetko, Hanna B. Margońska, Piotr Rutkowski. 1998. Distribution of the orchid in West and South-West Pacific islands- a preliminary report. Fragm. Flor. Geobot. 43 (1): 39–58.
 Dariusz L. Szlachetko, Hanna B. Margońska. 1998. New species of the genus Crepidium Bl. (Orchidaceae), from Australasia. Adansonia ser.3., 20 (2):341-349.
 Dariusz L. Szlachetko, Hanna B. Margońska. 1998. Notes on the genus Crepidium Bl. (Orchidaceae, Malaxidinae), with descriptions of the new species from Northern Sumatra. Fragm. Flor. Geobot. 43 (2): 183–188.

1999 
 Dariusz L. Szlachetko, Hanna B. Margońska. 1999. Redefinition of the genus Pseudoliparis Finet, with descriptions of new species. Adansonia ser.3., 21 (2): 275–282.
 Dariusz L. Szlachetko, Hanna B. Margońska, Piotr Rutkowski. 1999. Dienia seidenfadeniana, a new orchid species from Australia. Adansonia ser.3., 21 (2): 221–223.
 Hanna B. Margońska, Dariusz L. Szlachetko, T. Kubala. 1999. Ein neue Art der Gattung Crepidium (Orchidaceae, Malaxidinae) aus Papua Neuguinea. Die Orchidee 50 (5): 510–512.
 Hanna B. Margońska, Dariusz L. Szlachetko, T. Kubala. 1999. Ein neue Art der Gattung Crepidium (Orchidaceae, Malaxidinae) aus Papua Neuguinea. Die Orchidee 50 (6): 651–653.

2000 
 Hanna B. Margońska, Dariusz L. Szlachetko. 2000. New species of the genus Crepidium Bl. (Orchidaceae, Malaxidinae) from New Guinea. - Adansonia ser. 3., 22 (2): 265–267.
 Hanna B. Margońska, Dariusz L. Szlachetko. 2000. Notes on the genus Pseudoliparis Finet (Orchidaceae, Malaxidinae), with descriptions of two new species from New Guinea. Ann. Bot. Fen. 37: 279–283.
 Dariusz L. Szlachetko, Hanna B. Margońska. 2000. New Crepidium (Orchidaceae, Malaxidinae) species from Solomon Island and Bismarck Archipelago. Ann. Bot. Fen. 37: 303–307.

2001 
 Hanna B. Margońska, Dariusz L. Szlachetko. 2001. Saurolophorkis Marg. & Szlach., gen. Nov. (Orchidaceae, Malaxidinae), a new orchid genus from New Guinea. Pol. Bot. Journ. 46 (1): 7–9.
 Dariusz L. Szlachetko, Hanna B. Margońska. 2001. Genera et Species Orchidalium 2. Spuricianthus (Orchidaceae), a new orchid genus from New Caledonia. Pol.Bot.Journ. 46(1):27-29.
 Hanna B. Margońska, Dariusz L. Szlachetko. 2001. More notes on the genus Pseudoliparis Finet. (Orchidaceae, Malaxidinae). Pol. Bot. Journ. 46 (1): 39–42.
 Hanna B. Margońska, Dariusz L. Szlachetko. 2001. Notes on the genus Crepidium (Orchidaceae, Malaxidinae). Pol. Bot. Journ. 46 (1): 43–54.
 Hanna B. Margońska, Dariusz L. Szlachetko. 2001. A new Crepidium species (Orchidaceae, Malaxidinae), from Sarawak, Borneo. Pol. Bot. Journ. 46 (1): 67–69.
 Dariusz L. Szlachetko, Hanna B. Margońska. 2001. Crossoglossa neirynckiana Szlach. & Marg., sp. Nov., a new species of the subtribe Malaxidinae (Orchidaceae), from Ecuador. Ann. Bot. Fen. 38: 91–93.
 Hanna B. Margońska, Dariusz L. Szlachetko. 2001. Alatiliparis Marg. & Szlach., gen. Nov. (Orchidaceae, Malaxidinae), a new orchid genus with two new species from Sumatra. Ann. Bot. Fen. 38: 77–81.
 Dariusz L. Szlachetko, Hanna B. Margońska. 2001. Genera et Species Orchidalium 3. Subfamily Epidendroideae. Pol. Bot. Journ. 46 (2): 113–121.
 Dariusz L. Szlachetko, Hanna B. Margońska. 2001. Genera et Species Orchidalium 4. The new South American genus Jouyella (Thelymitroideae). Pol. Bot. Journ. 46 (2): 123–125.
 Hanna B. Margońska, Dariusz L. Szlachetko. 2001. Materials to the revision of the genus Seidenfia Szlach. (Orchidaceae, Malaxidinae), with description of new species. Pol. Bot. J. 46 (1): 47–62.

2002 
 Margońska H. B., 2002. A new Crepidium species (Orchidaceae, Malaxidinae), from Sabah, Borneo. Ann. Bot. Fen. 39 (1): 63–66.
 Dariusz L. Szlachetko, Hanna B. Margońska. 2002. Gynostemia Orchidalium. Vol. 2. Orchidaceae (Epidendroidea). Ann. Bot. Fen. 197pp+287 figs.
 Piotr Rutkowski, Hanna B. Margońska. 2002. Index of Gynostemia Orchidalium. Vol. 1 and Vol.2. Ann. Bot. Fen. 173: 262–275.

2003 
 Hanna B. Margońska. 2003. Materials towards the revision of the genus Pseudoliparis Finet (Orchidaceae, Malaxidinae) – part 1. Ann. Bot. Fen. 40 (1): 63–66.
 Hanna B. Margońska. 2003. Materials to taxonomic revision of subtribe Malaxidinae genera (Orchidales, Orchidaceae). Genus Intern. J. Invertebrate Taxonomy (Suppl.): 53–55.
 Hanna B. Margońska. 2003. Materials towards the revision of the genus Pseudoliparis Finet (Orchidaceae, Malaxidinae) – part 2. section Oistochilus. Ann. Bot. Fen. 40 (4): 357–372.
 Piotr Rutkowski, Hanna B. Margońska. 2003. Index of Gynostemia Orchidalium. Vol. 3. Ann. Bot. Fen. 176: 306–311.

2004 
 Hanna B. Margońska, Dariusz L. Szlachetko. 2004. Disticholiparis Marg. & Szlach. – new genus of subtribe Malaxidinae (Orchidales, Orchidaceae). Die Orchidee 55(2):175-179.
 Dariusz L. Szlachetko, Hanna B. Margońska. 2004. Habenariinae (Orchidaceae, Orchidoideae) – contributions to the revision the subtribe (8). Die Orchidee 55(2):172-174.
 Hanna B. Margońska. 2005. Materials towards the revision of the genus Pseudoliparis Finet (Orchidaceae, Malaxidinae) – part 3. section Pseudoliparis. Ann. Bot. Fen. 42: 267–291.

2005 
 Dariusz L. Szlachetko, Hanna B. Margońska, Joanna Mytnik. 2005. Veyretella flabellata (Orchidaceae, Habenariinae), a new species from Gabon. Ann. Bot. Fen. 42 (3): 227–229.
 Hanna B. Margońska. 2005. Crepidium klimkoanae – a new orchid species (Orchidaceae, Malaxidinae), from Thailand. Candollea 60 (2): 289–303.

2006 
 Hanna B. Margońska, Dariusz L. Szlachetko. 2006. The taxonomic revision of the genus Orestias Ridl. (Orchidales, Malaxidinea) from Africa. Ann. Nat. Mus. Wien. ser. Bot. 107.: 209–220.
 Hanna B. Margońska. 2006. Contribution to the taxonomic revision of the genus Crepidium (Orchidaceae-Malaxidinae): the new subsection Maximowiczianae (section Hololobus) Edin. J. Bot. 62 (3): 165–179.
 Hanna B. Margońska. 2006. A new combination and new subsection in Crepidium (Orchidaceae). Edin. J. Bot. 62 (3): 193–194.
 Hanna B. Margońska. 2006. Notes about genus Tamayorkis Szalch. with description of new species (Orchidales, Malaxidinea). Richardiana. 4(3): 123–129.
 Dariusz L. Szlachetko, Hanna B. Margońska. 2006. Stellilabium amicorum Szlach. & Marg. spec. nov. (Orchidaceae, Telipogoneae), eine neue Art aus Ecuador. Die Orchidee 57 (3): 320–324.
 Dariusz L. Szlachetko, Joanna Mytnik-Ejsmont, Agnieszka Romowicz, Hanna B. Margońska. 2006. Takulumena Szlach., & Marg. A New genus of the subtribe Epidendrinae (Orchidaceae) from Ecuador. Die Orchidee 57 (3): 325–329.
 Dariusz L. Szlachetko, Hanna B. Margońska. 2006. Redefinition of the genera Malaxis Sol. ex Sw. Microstylis (Nutt.) Eaton (Orchidaceae, Malaxidinae). Acta Soc. Bot. Pol. 75(3): 229–231.
 Hanna B. Margońska. 2006. State of researches of genus Disticholiparis Marg. & Szlach. (Orchidales, Malaxidinae). Biodiversity: Research and Conservation. 1-2: 11–14. Poznań.
 Dariusz L. Szlachetko, Magdalena Kułak, Piotr Rutkowski, Hanna B. Margońska. 2006. Epidendrum kusibabi Szlach., Kulak, Rutk. & Marg. spec. nov. (Orchidaceae, Epidendroideae), eine neue Art aus den Anden Ecuadors. Die Orchidee 57 (4): 480–483.
 Hanna B. Margońska. 2006. Seidenforchis – a new genus of subtribe Malaxidinae (Orchidaceae), from Thailand. Acta Soc. Bot. Pol. 75(4): 301–307.
 Dariusz L. Szlachetko, Hanna B. Margońska. 2006. New Holothrix species (Orchidaceae, Orchidoideae) from Angola. Candollea. 60 (2): 467–470.

2007 
 Hanna B. Margońska. 2007. Platystyliparis Marg. - a new genus of the subtribe Malaxidinae Richardiana 7(1): 33–41.
 Hanna B. Margońska. 2007. A new combination, new synonym and a lectotype in Lisowskia Szlach. (Orchidaceae, Malaxidinae). Richardiana 7(2): 50–52.

2008 
 Hanna B. Margońska, Agnieszka Kowalkowska. 2008. Une nouvelle forme de Anacamptis pyramidalis (Orchidaceae). Richardiana. 8(1) : 1–5.
 Hanna B. Margońska. 2008. Malaxidinae index nominum – genus Seidenfia Szalch. (Orchidales, Orchidaceae). Ann. Nat. Mus. Wien. ser. Bot. ser. Bot. 109. 173–178.
 Hanna B. Margońska. 2008. Malaxidinae index nominum – genus Microstylis (Nutt.) Eaton emend. Szalch. & Marg. (Orchidales, Orchidaceae). Ann. Nat. Mus. Wien. ser. Bot. 109. 179–189.
 Hanna B. Margońska. 2008. Malaxidinae index nominum – genus Tamayorkis Szalch. (Orchidales, Orchidaceae). Ann. Nat. Mus. Wien. ser. Bot. 109. 203–206.
 Hanna B. Margońska. 2008. Malaxidinae index nominum – genera Lisowskia Szalch. and Kornasia Szalch. (Orchidales, Orchidaceae). Ann. Nat. Mus. Wien. ser. Bot. 109. 191–196.
 Hanna B. Margońska. 2008. Malaxidinae index nominum – genus Pseudoliparis Finet emend. Szalch. & Marg. Sect. Oistochilos (Orchidales, Orchidaceae). Ann. Nat. Mus. Wien. ser. Bot. 109. 197–202.
 Dariusz L. Szlachetko, Hanna B. Margońska, Magdalena Kułak 2008. Nomenclatoral changes in Liparis-complex (Malaxidinae, Epidendroideae). Acta Soc. Bot. Pol. 77 (1): 35–40.
 Hanna B. Margońska. 2008. Taxonomic revision of Asiatic genus Glossochilopsis Szlach. (Malaxidinae, Orchidaceae). Richardiana. 8(2):70-79.
 Hanna B. Margońska, Agnieszka Kowalkowska. 2008. Taxonomic revision of Asiatic genus Dienia Lindl. (Malaxidinae, Orchidaceae). Ann. Bot. Fen. 45: 97-104.
 Dariusz L. Szlachetko, Joanna Mytnik-Ejsmont, Hanna B. Margońska. 2008. Cephalanthera ericiflora Szlach. & Mytnik sp. Nov. (Orchidaceae, Neottioideae), a new species from Laos. Acta Soc. Bot. Pol. 77 (3): 213–215.

2009 
 Hanna B. Margońska. 2009. Nomenclatural changes in Malgasian representatives of Malaxidinae (Orchidales, Orchidaceae). Richardiana 9(2): 90–99.
 Hanna B. Margońska. 2009. Malaxidinae index nominum – genus Pseudoliparis Finet emend. Szalch. & Marg. Sect. Pseudoliparis (Orchidales, Orchidaceae). Ann. Nat. Mus. Wien. ser. Bot. 110 B. 249–258.
 Hanna B. Margońska, Marta Kras, Magdalena Sawicka. 2009. New record of Habenaria tahitensis Nadeaud from the French Polynesia. Ann. Nat. Mus. Wien. ser. Bot. 110 B. 260–261.
 Agnieszka Kowalkowska, Hanna B. Margońska. 2009. Diversity of labellar micromorphological structures in selected species of Malaxidinae (Orchidales). Acta Soc. Bot. Pol. 78 (2): 141–150.
 Hanna B. Margońska. 2009. A new Stichorkis species from Borneo (Orchidaceae, Malaxidinae). Richardiana 10(1): 3-10.
 Hanna B. Margońska. 2009. Crossoliparis – a new genus of Malaxidinae (Orchidaceae, Malaxideae), from neotropic. Acta Soc. Bot. Pol. 78 (4): 297–299.
 Hanna B. Margońska. 2009. A new Stichorkis species (Orchidaceae, Malaxidinae) from Sarawak in Malaysia. Biodiversity: Research and Conservation. 13: 9-12.

2010 
 Marta Kras, Hanna B. Margońska. 2010. A new taxon of Habenaria (Orchidaceae, Habenariinae) from Tahiti. Ann. Nat. Mus. Wien. ser. Bot. 111 B.: 171–173.
 Hanna B. Margońska. 2010. Two new combination and a new subsection in Crepidium (Orchidaceae, Malaxidinaea). Ann. Nat. Mus. Wien. ser. Bot. 111 B.: 175–180.
 Kowalkowska A., Margońska H.B., Kozieradzka-Kiszkurno M. 2010. Comparative Anatomy of the Lip Spur and Additional Lateral Sepal Spurs in a Three-Spurred Form (f. fumeauxiana) of Anacamptis pyramidalis. Acta Biologica Cracoviensia. Ser. Bota. 52(1): 13–18.
 Hanna B. Margońska. 2010. A two new species of the genus Pseudoliparis Finet (Orchidaceae, Malaxidinae), from New Guinea. Biodiversity: Research and Conservation. 17: 3–8.
 Hanna B. Margońska, Dariusz L. Szlachetko. 2010. Orchidaceae of Tahiti (Polynesie Francaise). Gdańsk University Press.: 1–140, 37 phots. + 26 figs.

References

20th-century Polish botanists
Orchidologists
Year of birth missing (living people)
Living people
Polish women academics
Women botanists
Botanists with author abbreviations
21st-century Polish botanists
20th-century Polish women scientists
21st-century Polish women scientists